Putative Polycomb group protein ASXL1 is a protein that in humans is encoded by the ASXL1 gene.

In Drosophila, the Additional sex combs (Asx) gene encodes a chromatin-binding protein required for normal determination of segment identity in the developing embryo. The protein is a member of the Polycomb group of proteins, which are necessary for the maintenance of stable repression of homeotic and other loci. The protein is thought to disrupt chromatin in localized areas, enhancing transcription of certain genes while repressing the transcription of other genes. Although the function of the protein encoded by this gene is not known, it does show some sequence similarity to the protein encoded by the Drosophila Asx gene.

Model organisms

				
Model organisms have been used in the study of ASXL1 function. A conditional knockout mouse line, called Asxl1tm1a(EUCOMM)Wtsi was generated as part of the International Knockout Mouse Consortium program — a high-throughput mutagenesis project to generate and distribute animal models of disease to interested scientists.

Male and female animals underwent a standardized phenotypic screen to determine the effects of deletion. Twenty five tests were carried out on mutant mice and four significant abnormalities were observed. Few homozygous mutant embryos were identified during gestation and those that were alive had craniofacial and eye defects, none survived until weaning. The remaining tests were carried out on heterozygous mutant adult mice; decreased vertebrae number and increased bone strength was observed in these animals.

References

External links

Further reading

Genes mutated in mice